German submarine U-252 was a Type VIIC U-boat of Nazi Germany's Kriegsmarine during World War II. The submarine was laid down on 1 November 1940 at the Vegesacker Werft at Bremen as yard number 17, launched on 14 August 1941 and commissioned on 4 October under the command of Kapitänleutnant Gunter Schiebusch.

Schiebusch was replaced by Kapitänleutnant Kai Lerchen on 21 December 1941. After training with the 6th U-boat Flotilla at Kiel, U-252 was deemed to be ready for front-line service and sailed on her first patrol on 1 April 1942.

On 6 April 1942, U-252 landed espionage agent Ib Riis in Iceland.

U-252 is thought to have sunk the 1,355 GRT Norwegian Fanefield on 9 April. Five days later she encountered convoy OG 82, and was attacked and sunk by depth charges from the sloop  and the corvette  on 14 April 1942.

The U-252 can be seen on YouTube video 'Diving on Nazi submarine U-252' https://www.youtube.com/watch?v=Gw3EsX5bh4g

Design
German Type VIIC submarines were preceded by the shorter Type VIIB submarines. U-252 had a displacement of  when at the surface and  while submerged. She had two shafts and two  propellers.

U-252 was fitted with five  torpedo tubes (four fitted at the bow and one at the stern), fourteen torpedoes, one  SK C/35 naval gun, 220 rounds, and two twin  C/30 anti-aircraft guns. The boat had a complement of between forty-four and sixty.

Summary of raiding history

See also
 Double-Cross System

References

Bibliography

*

 Axel Neistle : German U-Boat Losses during World War II (1998)

External links

U-boats commissioned in 1941
1941 ships
Ships built in Bremen (state)
German Type VIIC submarines
World War II submarines of Germany
U-boats sunk in 1942
U-boats sunk by British warships
U-boats sunk by depth charges
World War II shipwrecks in the Atlantic Ocean
Ships lost with all hands
Maritime incidents in April 1942